Park Byung-eun (born 14 July 1977) is a South Korean actor.

Personal life
Park majored in drama at Chung-Ang University.

Park was set to debut with 90s South Korean boy group Taesaja in 1997, but gave up due to him feeling that he cannot sing well.

Career 
Park made his debut in 2000 with a minor role in the TV series Mr. Duke. He had bit roles in Sex Is Zero (2002), Princess Aurora (2005), and I'm a Cyborg, But That's OK (2005).

In 2008, he had his first major role in the drama film The Pit and the Pendulum Pit (2008).

In 2015, he played a Japanese lieutenant in Assassination and was signed to a management company after his performance.

In 2016, he notably landed his first leading role in the film One Line (2016).

He also diversified his roles recently by starring in the rom-com TV series Because This Is My First Life (2017) and in the historical war epic The Great Battle (2018), Kingdom  (2020) and Kingdom: Ashin of the North (2021).

Filmography

Film

Television series

Web series

Hosting

References

External links 
 

1977 births
Living people
South Korean male television actors
South Korean male film actors